2797 km is a rural locality (a railway station) in Glukhovskoye Rural Settlement of Kalachinsky District, Russia. The population was 13 as of 2010.

Geography 
The village is located 5 km east from Kalachinsk.

Streets 
 Lesnaya

References 

Rural localities in Omsk Oblast